The Red Pillar is a mountain on Vancouver Island, British Columbia, Canada, located  southwest of Courtenay and  south of Mount Albert Edward.

The Red Pillar is a member of the Vancouver Island Ranges which in turn form part of the Insular Mountains.

History 
The Red Pillar's name is descriptive, according to the BC Geographical Names Information System:
The mountain was climbed in 1931 by local climbers Geoff Capes and Jack Gregson; they left a note in a cairn at the summit naming it "The Pillar". (Ruth Masters, Comox & District Mountaineering Club)

"...the highest peak in the glacier region, which was first climbed on August 1, 1931. The party of which I was one, did not wish to call the peak after one of our number so left the request in the cairn we erected that is should be called "The Pillar." There are many other Pillars so may I suggest that it be called The Red Pillar as it is of distinctly reddish rock." (July 1935 letter from Ben Hughes, publisher, Comox Argus)

Access 

The easiest access to The Red Pillar is from the south, via the Ash River Trail.  The trail starts at the north-west end of Oshinow Lake.  There are two ways to reach the trail head:

 Paddle the length of Oshinow Lake starting from the launch at the south-east end.
 Hike the overgrown and washed-out logging branch, 110H, along the east side of Oshinow Lake.

Alternatively, The Red Pillar can be accessed by from the Comox Glacier by traversing over, or going around, Argus Mountain.

See also 
 List of mountains in Strathcona Provincial Park
 List of mountain peaks of British Columbia

References 

Alberni Valley
Vancouver Island Ranges
Mid Vancouver Island
Two-thousanders of British Columbia
Clayoquot Land District